Stockleigh may refer to the following places:

 Stockleigh, Queensland, Australia
 Stockleigh English, Devon, England
 Stockleigh Pomeroy, Devon, England

See also
 Stockley (disambiguation)